Christianus Cornelius Uhlenbeck (18 October 1866, in Voorburg, the Netherlands – 12 August 1951, in Lugano, Switzerland) was a Dutch linguist and anthropologist with a wide variety of research interests. His published work included books and articles on Germanic and Balto-Slavic languages, Sanskrit, Basque, and the Blackfoot language of North American Indians. He served as a lecturer at Leiden University.

In 1904 Uhlenbeck became member of the Royal Netherlands Academy of Arts and Sciences.

In the summer of 1911,  Dr. C.C. Uhlenbeck visited the Blackfoot Indian reservation in Montana to conduct field work. He was accompanied by his wife, Wilhelmina Maria Uhlenbeck, whose diary was later incorporated into their book about this expedition.

Bibliography
Uhlenbeck, C.C. A Concise Blackfoot Grammar Based on Material from the Southern Peigans, New York: AMS, 1978. (Originally published 1938 by Hollandsche Uitgevers-Maatschappij, Amsterdam, in series Verhandelingen der Koninklijke Akademie van Wetenschappen te Amsterdam, Afdeeling Letterkunde. Nieuwe Reeks, Deel XLI) OCLC: 3097417
Uhlenbeck, C.C. An English-Blackfoot Vocabulary, New York: AMS, 1979. (Originally published 1930 in series: Verhandelingen der Koninklijke Akademie van Wetenschappen te Amsterdam, Afd. Letterkunde, Nieuwe Reeks, Deel 29, No. 4) 
Uhlenbeck, C.C. and R.H. van Gulik. A Blackfoot-English Vocabulary Based on Material from the Southern Peigans, Amsterdam: Uitgave van de N.V. Noord-Hollandsche Uitgevers-Jaatschapp-ij, 1934. (Verhandelingen der Koninklijke Akademie Van WetenSchappen te Amsterdam. Afdeeling Letterkunde, Nieuwe Reeks, Deel XXXIII, No. 2)

References

1866 births
1951 deaths
Linguists from the Netherlands
Dutch anthropologists
People from Haarlem 
Leiden University alumni
Academic staff of Leiden University
Members of the Royal Netherlands Academy of Arts and Sciences
Basque-language scholars
Linguists of Algic languages
Paleolinguists